The 1989 Cleveland Browns season was the team's 40th season with the National Football League.

It was the Browns' first season with head coach Bud Carson, who had been the defensive coordinator of the New York Jets the previous season. The Browns finished with a 9-6-1 record, good enough for a division title and the second seed in the playoffs, and reached their third AFC Championship Game in four seasons, and for the third time lost to the Denver Broncos.

It would be the Browns’ fifth consecutive season making the playoffs, but it would prove their last until 1994. The team hasn't won a division title since this season, the longest active drought in the NFL. As of 2022, this is their most recent appearance in the AFC Championship game.

Personnel

Staff

Roster

Schedule 

Note: Intra-division opponents are in bold text.

Game summaries

Week 1 

Bud Carson begins his Browns head coaching career with a memorable 51–0 victory over the Steelers in Pittsburgh. It is the most lopsided victory in the 79-game series between the teams and the Browns' biggest shutout ever. Carson, Pittsburgh's former defensive coordinator, watches his team force eight turnovers, record seven sacks and score three touchdowns (two by linebacker David Grayson).

Week 2

Week 4 
The Browns snap a 10-game losing streak against Denver with a controversial 16–13 win at Cleveland Municipal Stadium. The game was decided by a Matt Bahr 48-yard field goal as time expired – a kick that barely made the crossbar. Bahr's field goal comes after referee Tom Dooley ordered the teams to switch ends of the field, thanks to rowdy Dawg Pound fans who pelt the Broncos with dog biscuits, eggs and other debris. The switch gave the Browns a timely wind advantage.

Week 7 
Wide receiver Webster Slaughter catches eight passes for 186 yards in leading the Browns to a 27–7 win over the Chicago Bears on ABC's Monday Night Football at Cleveland Municipal Stadium. One of the catches is a 96-yard touchdown pass from Kosar – the longest play from scrimmage in Browns history.

Week 8 
For the first time in more than a decade Ozzie Newsome did not catch a pass, but the Browns still beat Houston, 28–17. The Browns explode for 326 second-half yards as Kosar throws touchdown passes of 80 and 77 yards to Slaughter. Newsome's club record streak of 150 consecutive games with a reception ends.

Week 11 
Former coach Marty Schottenheimer, returning to Cleveland with his Chiefs, has to settle for a 10–10 tie as Kansas City kicker Nick Lowery misses three makeable field goal attempts: 45- and 39- yard attempts In the final 10 seconds of regulation and a 47-yard attempt with seven seconds left in overtime. The Browns fumble four times, throw one interception and punt a club-record-tying 12 times. This was the first Browns' tie since the introduction of overtime in regular season games in 1974. The Browns would not record another tie until Week 1 of the 2018 season.

Week 16 
With the AFC Central title and a wild-card berth at stake, the Browns blow a 17-point lead before bouncing back to defeat the Oilers, 24–20 at the Astrodome. The Browns march 58 yards with no timeouts and Kevin Mack scores on a 4-yard touchdown run with 39 seconds left to save the day.

As of February 2022, the 1989 season marks the last time that the Browns have won a division title. The 30 season drought without a division title is the longest active drought in the NFL.

Postseason

AFC Divisional Playoff
Buffalo Bills (9–7) at Cleveland Browns (9–6–1)

Standings

Notes

References

External links 
 1989 Cleveland Browns at Pro Football Reference (Profootballreference.com)
 1989 Cleveland Browns Statistics at jt-sw.com
 1989 Cleveland Browns Schedule at jt-sw.com
 1989 Cleveland Browns at DatabaseFootball.com  

Cleveland
Cleveland Browns seasons
AFC Central championship seasons
Cleveland